Raimar may refer to:

 Charles Revson (1906-1975), American businessman and philanthropist who created the cosmetic brand Revlon
 Peter Revson (1939-1974), American race car driver
 Revson (footballer) (born 1992), full name Revson Cordeiro dos Santos, Brazilian footballer
 Revson Fountain, fountain in Manhattan, New York City